The Yokosuka B4Y, (Navy Type 96 Carrier Attack Bomber), carrier-borne torpedo bomber was used by the Imperial Japanese Navy Air Service from 1936 to 1943. The B4Y replaced the Mitsubishi B2M2 and was the last biplane bomber used operationally by the Imperial Japanese Navy. The Allied reporting name was "Jean".

Design and development
In 1932, the Imperial Japanese Navy issued a requirement for a new carrier-borne attack aircraft. Aichi, Mitsubishi and Nakajima responded to this requirement and each built a prototype. None of these aircraft were deemed satisfactory, and the service thus issued in 1934 a new requirement, 9-Shi, for a more capable aircraft to replace the obsolescent Yokosuka B3Y.

The B4Y was designed by Sanae Kawasaki at the First Naval Air Technical Arsenal at Yokosuka. Regarded only as an interim type, the Navy wanted a torpedo bomber offering performance comparable to the Mitsubishi A5M monoplane fighter. The result was a biplane with fixed landing gear and an all-metal structure with metal or fabric skin. To speed development and production, the B4Y utilised the wings from the Kawanishi E7K. The B4Y1 was also the first Navy carrier attack aircraft to utilize an air-cooled engine, as the prototype that was equipped with the Nakajima Hikari 2 radial engine performed better than its competitors.

The crew of three occupied two cockpits. The pilot in the open front cockpit and the other two crewmen, (navigator and radio operator/gunner), in the enclosed rear cockpit.

Operational Service

On 12 December 1937 3 B4Y1s were involved in the Panay incident during a Japanese attack on the United States Navy gunboat Panay while she was anchored in the Yangtze River outside of Nanjing.

Although primarily used as a carrier-based aircraft, the B4Y1 was also used as a land-based bomber on occasion.

Before its replacement, the B4Y1 had flown during the Second Sino-Japanese War and served at the Battle of Midway during June 1942, where eight of them were operated from Hōshō. It was one of these planes from Hōshō which took photographs of the burning  on 5 June 1942.

Variants
First Prototype  Hiro Type 91 520 hp water-cooled W-12 driving a two-bladed  propeller.
Second and Third Prototypes  Nakajima Kotobuki 3 nine-cylinder air-cooled radial driving a two-bladed propeller.
Fourth and Fifth Prototype and Production Aircraft  Nakajima Hikari 2 nine-cylinder air-cooled radial driving a two-bladed propeller.

Production
 First Naval Air Technical Arsenal, Yokosuka: 5 prototypes (1935–36)
 Nakajima Aircraft Company: 37 production aircraft (1937–38)
 Mitsubishi Heavy Industries, Nagoya: 135 production aircraft (1937–38)
 11th Naval Air Arsenal, Hiro: 28 production aircraft (1938)
 Total: 205 aircraft

Operators

 Imperial Japanese Navy Air Service

Specifications (B4Y1)

See also
 List of military aircraft of Japan

References

Notes

Bibliography

 
 English Translation of Kojinsha No. 6 Warships of the Imperial Japanese Navy.
 

B4Y
B4Y, Yokosuka
Single-engined tractor aircraft
Biplanes
Carrier-based aircraft
Aircraft first flown in 1935